Carola Dombeck (born 25 June 1960 in Merseburg, Bezirk Halle) is a German former gymnast who competed in the 1976 Summer Olympics.

References

1960 births
Living people
People from Merseburg
People from Bezirk Halle
German female artistic gymnasts
Sportspeople from Saxony-Anhalt
Olympic gymnasts of East Germany
Gymnasts at the 1976 Summer Olympics
Olympic silver medalists for East Germany
Olympic bronze medalists for East Germany
Olympic medalists in gymnastics
Recipients of the Patriotic Order of Merit in bronze
Medalists at the 1976 Summer Olympics
20th-century German women